Local radio can refer to:

 Community radio
 Low-power broadcasting
 Pirate radio

In the UK:
BBC Local Radio
Independent Local Radio

In Australia:
ABC Local Radio by the Australian Broadcasting Corporation